Track of the Cat is a 1993 book written by Nevada Barr and published by G. P. Putnam's Sons (now owned by the Penguin Group). The book went on to win the Anthony Award for Best First Novel in 1994.

This first novel for author Barr features her character Anna Pigeon, and is the first of a series of novels with this character.

References 

Anthony Award-winning works
American mystery novels
1993 American novels
Books about cats
G. P. Putnam's Sons books